Hologymnetis argenteola is a species of fruit or flower chafer in the family Scarabaeidae.

References

Further reading

External links

 

Cetoniinae
Beetles described in 1889